Asheqan (also Romanized as ‘Āsheqān; also known as Ashkan and Hāshekān) is a village in Byaban Rural District, Byaban District, Minab County, Hormozgan Province, Iran. At the 2006 census, its population was 115, in 24 families.

References 

Populated places in Minab County